Hello Namasthe is a 2016 Indian Malayalam comedy film directed by Jayan K. Nair and produced by Freedia Entertainment. Narrating the story of two modern-day couples as they find themselves at crossroads over a jackfruit tree that stands between their villas, Hello Namasthe was released on February 19, 2016. It stars Vinay Forrt, Bhavana, Sanju Sivram, and Miya.

Plot 
The story starts with two young RJs (Radio Jockey) who are Madhav (Vinay Forrt) and Jerry (Sanju Sivram). They both are working as hosts for a radio show called Hello Namasthe. Jerry was invited to his ex-girlfriend Anna's (Miya) wedding. She was going to wed a man named Pappu Joseph Thadikkaran (Aju Varghese) that day. Jerry went with Madhav and Abu (Soubin Shahir).After they see her bride groom  Pappu, Jerry, Madhav and Abu don't like Pappu, and they persuade Jerry to ask Anna to go with them and Anna agrees. They drop Abu in his house and Madhav, Jerry and Anna go to Madhav's house. There they meet Madhav's wife Priya (Bhavana), who is obsessed with cleanliness (a kind of Obsessive-Compulsive Disorder). Jerry and Anna decide to get married. After that they all move to a colony of villas. In the colony there was one Jackfruit tree between their houses which creates a fight between them. How they try to defeat each other forms the rest of the story.

Cast

Music

The soundtrack was released by Satyam Audios in December 2015 with songs composed by Masala Coffee and Deepankuran, and lyrics written by Kaithapram and Anil Panachooran.

References

External links
 

2010s Malayalam-language films
2016 films
Films scored by Masala Coffee